Joel Isasi González (born July 31, 1967) is a former sprinter from Cuba.

He who won an Olympic bronze medal in 4 x 100 metres relay in Barcelona 1992 and a silver medal at the 4 x 100 relay at the 1990 Goodwill Games. His personal best of 10.22 (100 metres) and 21.64 (200 metres) was both set during 1995.

International competitions

1Representing the Americas

References

External links
 
  

1967 births
Living people
Cuban male sprinters
Olympic athletes of Cuba
Olympic bronze medalists for Cuba
Athletes (track and field) at the 1992 Summer Olympics
Athletes (track and field) at the 1996 Summer Olympics
Pan American Games medalists in athletics (track and field)
Pan American Games gold medalists for Cuba
Athletes (track and field) at the 1991 Pan American Games
Athletes (track and field) at the 1995 Pan American Games
World Athletics Championships athletes for Cuba
Medalists at the 1992 Summer Olympics
Olympic bronze medalists in athletics (track and field)
Universiade medalists in athletics (track and field)
Central American and Caribbean Games gold medalists for Cuba
Competitors at the 1990 Central American and Caribbean Games
Competitors at the 1993 Central American and Caribbean Games
Goodwill Games medalists in athletics
Universiade bronze medalists for Cuba
Central American and Caribbean Games medalists in athletics
Medalists at the 1989 Summer Universiade
Medalists at the 1993 Summer Universiade
Competitors at the 1990 Goodwill Games
Medalists at the 1995 Pan American Games